Wishes is the debut studio album by British musician Rhodes, released on 18 September 2015 through Imports Records.

Critical reception

Susie Garrard of Renowned for Sound gave the album a favorite review saying "Though there was a great deal of charm to the untried, untested talent that hinted at a great deal more to come, Rhodes more than delivers on that promise with Wishes... you get the feeling that even now, Rhodes is still just beginning to touch the edges of his talent."

Manuel Berger from the German music review website laut.de praised the album and compared Rhodes' musical style to that of Hozier and Lana Del Rey among others. The critic wrote that the album has the potential to suit the taste of a wide variety of listeners.

Track listing

Charts

References 

2015 debut albums